Cellulite Soul is the debut studio album by the Australian alternative rock and post-punk band Witch Hats, released through In-Fidelity Recordings on 26 March 2008.

The album was produced by Ben Ling and Phill Calvert of The Birthday Party. The track "Before I Weigh" was released as a 7-inch single prior to the album's release in November 2007. While on tour in the US, they released a second 7-inch single for "Hellhole" on the New York indie label New York Night Train. In 2009, "Hellhole" appeared in Sean Byrne's Australian horror film The Loved Ones. The album is littered with deliberate lyrical spelling errors, including 6 of the 10 track's titles.

Track listing

References

2008 debut albums
Witch Hats albums